A blipvert is a very brief television advertisement, lasting one second. The word is a portmanteau of blip, a brief sound, and advertisement.

The term and concept were used in the 1985 film Max Headroom: 20 Minutes into the Future and in Blipverts, the first episode of the 1987 science fiction television show Max Headroom. In the film and TV show, "blipverts" were new high-speed, concentrated, high-intensity television commercials lasting about three seconds. Their purpose was to prevent the channel-switching that may occur during standard-length commercials.  They were invented as a MacGuffin to drive the plot.

Real-life examples of compressed advertising 
Real life advertisements have been cited as benefiting from a "blipvert effect", in which viewers recall the advertisements better.

Master Lock, which had already made the image of a padlock shot by a sharpshooter into a lasting advertising image with their ad in the Super Bowl in 1974, incorporated that video image, along with its logo, in a one-second-long television commercial in 1998.  Advertising Age, in describing why the concept did not catch on, said that is "difficult to do much with a one-second ad".

In May 2006, GE introduced "One Second Theater",  television commercials with additional material included as individual frames in the last second of the ad, for frame-by-frame viewing with digital video recorders. When viewed at normal speed, the frames flash by rapidly, much like blipverts.

Miller Brewing Company aired a one-second ad during the Super Bowl XLIII football game in February 2009. The ad featured Windell Middlebrooks, who had been featured in Miller High Life ads since 2006, standing in a warehouse filled with High Life boxes and quickly shouting "High Life!"

References

External links
GE One Second Theater

Max Headroom
Television commercials
Television advertising